Neonemoria is a monotypic moth genus in the family Geometridae described by Warren in 1904. Its only species, Neonemoria thalassinata, found in Colombia, was first described by Snellen in 1874. There is one subspecies, Neonemoria thalassinata rasa, described by Warren in 1900, which was found in Venezuela.

References

Sterrhinae
Monotypic moth genera